Glenn Andrew Mark Snyders (born 7 April 1987) is a South African-born former competitive swimmer for New Zealand. He won the silver medal in the 50 m breaststroke at the 2010 Commonwealth Games in a time of 27.67 seconds. He currently holds the New Zealand records for 50 m, 100 m and 200 m breaststroke in both long course and short course.

He also competed at the 2006 Commonwealth Games and the 2008 Summer Olympics. In the latter, he swam the breaststroke leg for the New Zealand team which finished fifth in the final of the Men's 4 × 100 metre medley relay. He also competed at the 2012 Summer Olympics in the 100 m and 200 m breaststroke and the 4 x 100 metre medley relay.

He moved from South Africa with his parents when he was twelve. He was the 2011 New Zealand Swimmer of the Year.

Personal best times
.

References

External links
 
 
 

1987 births
Living people
New Zealand male breaststroke swimmers
Olympic swimmers of New Zealand
Swimmers at the 2008 Summer Olympics
Swimmers at the 2012 Summer Olympics
Swimmers at the 2006 Commonwealth Games
Swimmers at the 2010 Commonwealth Games
Commonwealth Games silver medallists for New Zealand
Medalists at the FINA World Swimming Championships (25 m)
Swimmers at the 2016 Summer Olympics
Commonwealth Games medallists in swimming
Swimmers at the 2014 Commonwealth Games
Universiade medalists in swimming
Universiade gold medalists for New Zealand
Universiade silver medalists for New Zealand
Universiade bronze medalists for New Zealand
Medalists at the 2011 Summer Universiade
Medallists at the 2010 Commonwealth Games